Rafał Siemaszko (born 11 September 1986) is a Polish footballer who plays as a forward for KTS-K Wikęd Luzino.

Career

Club
In the summer 2010, he was loaned to Arka Gdynia on a one-year deal. He returned to Orkan one year later. Siemaszko played in Gryf Wejherowo from 2012 to 2014, Next season he spent in Chojniczanka Chojnice Chojniczanka Chojnice, and in 2015 he returned to Arka Gdynia

Honours

Club
Arka Gdynia
 I liga: 2015–16
 Polish Cup: 2016–17
 Polish Super Cup: 2017, 2018

References

External links
 
 

1986 births
People from Wejherowo
Sportspeople from Pomeranian Voivodeship
Living people
Polish footballers
Association football forwards
Arka Gdynia players
Gryf Wejherowo players
Chojniczanka Chojnice players
Ekstraklasa players
I liga players
II liga players